Franz Fuchs (25 November 1915 – May 1990) was an Austrian professional football manager. He coached ADO Den Haag, BVC Rotterdam, Holland Sport, Blauw-Wit Amsterdam, Feijenoord, Blauw-Wit Amsterdam, SK Sturm Graz, Belenenses and Hamborn 07.

References

External links

1915 births
1990 deaths
Austrian football managers
ADO Den Haag managers
Feyenoord managers
Blauw-Wit Amsterdam managers
C.F. Os Belenenses managers
SK Sturm Graz managers
SVV Scheveningen managers
Austrian expatriate football managers
Austrian expatriate sportspeople in the Netherlands
Expatriate football managers in the Netherlands
Austrian expatriate sportspeople in Portugal
Expatriate football managers in Portugal
Austrian expatriate sportspeople in Germany
Expatriate football managers in Germany